The 2019 Combined Austrian Championships were the first Austrian national championships for competition climbing in combined format. It was held in Innsbruck, Austria from 13 to 16 June 2019, together with the Austrian Championships for speed, bouldering and lead disciplines. In this competition, the athletes competed in three disciplines (speed, bouldering, and lead) in combined format. The winner for men was Jakob Schubert and for women was Jessica Pilz.

Competition format 
It was held based on and to simulate the latest Olympic combined format.

Athletes were ranked based on their scores in separate disciplines. Points were calculated by multiplying the ranks of each athlete in the three disciplines.

Men 
The final round of combined nationals started with speed discipline, where Matthias Erber took the lead. Next in bouldering, Jakob Schubert climbed strongly to top all three boulder problems in five attempts, two attempts less than the second place Elias Weiler. Last in lead, Schubert topped the route, the only one to do so. Schubert won the competition with just 3 points (3x1x1), far ahead the second place Nicolai Uznik's 48 points (4x3x4).

Women 
The finals started with speed race, where Sandra Lettner claimed top place. Next in bouldering, Jessica Pilz took the first place by topping all three boulder problems in six attempts, three attempts less than Lettner. Last in lead, Pilz continued to show her climbing prowess and became the only one to top the route. After multiplying the ranks of the three disciplines, Pilz won with 3 points (3x1x1), while Lettner took the second place with 10 points (1x2x5).

References

External links 

 Austria Climbing - Official website

2019 in sport climbing
Climbing competitions